Daniel Austin was a Christian Brigadier in the Pakistan Army.

Early life
He was born in Christian Town, Sialkot in 1935. He attended the CTI School in Sialkot, where he enjoyed athletics, track and field and basketball. He had a lifelong interest in basketball and was captain of his school, college and university teams.

Career
After graduation, Austin joined the Pakistan Army. He graduated from the Pakistan Command and Staff College in Quetta and participated in several other command and tactical courses both within the country and abroad. He commanded a Cavalry Regiment and served as Director Budget for the Pakistan Army. Austin retired from active service in 1988 with the rank of Brigadier. During his career he received the Tamgha-e-Basalat, Sitara -e- Harb and the Tamgha-e-Jang. He was also awarded the President’s Pride of Performance Medal for his contribution to the field of sports.

Sports
Austin captained the Pakistan national basketball team. Under his captaincy the team won silver medals in international championships in Tehran and Lahore. He was also a member 
of the national basketball team which played test matches against Iran and took part in the Quadrangular Championships in Sri Lanka in 1957. Austin also coordinated the National Boxing Championships in 1985 and the Pakistan-Holland hockey test matches in Islamabad. He was also the Chief Coordinator of the 4th SAF Games held in Islamabad in 1989. Austin also 
represented Pakistan on a number of international organizations and competitions. He was Pakistan’s deputy chef de mission at the 1982 Asian Games held in Delhi. He also served as Vice President of the Pakistan Olympic Association, the Pakistan Amateur Wrestling Federation, Chair of the Defence Services Sports Board and Director General, Pakistan Sports Board.

He served on the Board of the Christian Study Centre and St. John’s High School in Rawalpindi. He also served as Administrator and CEO of the United Christian Hospital, Lahore between 1990 and 1997.

Brigadier Daniel Austin died on 29 December 2013. A memorial service was held at the Cathedral Church of the Resurrection in Lahore on 25 January 2014.

The fourth Kashmir Cup All Pakistan Basketball Championship was postponed for a month as a mark of respect.

References

Pakistani Christians
Pakistan Army officers
Pakistani men's basketball players
2013 deaths
1935 births
Pakistan Command and Staff College alumni